Cristián Reitze Campos (13 March 1950) is a Chilean politician and businessman. He is a member of the Humanist Party of Chile (PH) and acted as president of the party. In 1993 he was one of the candidates for the presidency of Chile, representing the Humanist Green Alliance (Alianza Humanista Verde, AHV), but only gained 1.17% of the total valid votes; Eduardo Frei Ruiz-Tagle was eventually elected.

In the 1997 parliamentary elections, he was a candidate for senator for Santiago Poniente. After the elections, he continued to work inside the Humanist Party, and he dedicated himself to his family's business of selling cars.

Electoral history

Presidential election, 1993 
 1993 Chilean presidential election

Parliamentary election, 1997 
 1997 Chilean parliamentary election for Santiago Poniente

References 

Chilean businesspeople
Humanist Party (Chile) politicians
Candidates for President of Chile
Living people
1950 births